The BNSF Hauser Refueling Facility is a rail yard and fueling station located near Rathdrum, Idaho, owned and operated by the

Burlington Northern Santa Fe (BNSF) Railway Company which was completed in 2004. The facility serves as a critical refueling point for BNSF trains that traverse the northern United States transcontinental.

The facility features several large fuel storage tanks, capable of holding thousands of gallons of diesel fuel. The facility moves 250,000 gallons of fuel daily and almost 7 million per month. These tanks are connected to a network of pumps and hoses that allow trains to be refueled quickly and efficiently. In addition to fueling services, the facility also provides routine maintenance and repair services for BNSF locomotives and railcars.

The BNSF Hauser Refueling Facility is strategically located near several major highways and transportation hubs, making it a key logistics center for the transportation of goods throughout the Pacific Northwest and beyond.

History 

The construction of the fueling facility for BNSF's Hauser Refueling Depot involved several protection measures to safeguard the environment around it. These measures included two high-density underground containment liners with leak detection, double-walled underground piping, and double-bottom diesel storage tanks. Above ground, locomotive fueling takes place on reinforced concrete platforms coated with an industrial seal to contain water run-off. Additionally, the facility is computer-controlled with sensors monitoring all aspects of the facility. The Hauser Refueling Facility serves as a crucial location for the BNSF railroad, covering the nation from Chicago into Canada and down the West Coast, transporting essential goods like grains, fuel, energy products, medicine, paper, and food. The construction was initially controversial, but ultimately deemed an improvement over sandwiching a fuel tender between locomotives as Burlington Northern had done up until the BNSF merger in 2000. The Hauser Refueling Facility was completed in 2004.

28 to 35 locomotives are serviced through a quick-stop process every day, which enables the trains to transport freight more efficiently and reduces wait times. The Hauser refueling facility is a significant source of employment in the area, generating hundreds of jobs. Moreover, the facility has raised the bar in environmental protection by implementing advanced environmental monitoring and detection systems. In fact, no other facility throughout North Idaho or the Spokane Valley has this level of environmental monitoring and detection systems. The ground under the refueling pad is lined with impermeable material to prevent any contamination from seeping into the groundwater. However, the recent wastewater spill at the facility has raised questions about the effectiveness of these protective measures, as the transfer pipes intended to carry wastewater to nearby holding tanks were not lined with impermeable material, leading to contamination of the Spokane Aquifer, the sole source of drinking water for 400,000 people in northern Idaho and northeast Washington.

Spills 

In December 2004, a wastewater spill occurred at the Hauser Refueling Facility owned by Burlington Northern and Santa Fe Co. Small amounts of petroleum-laced wastewater reached the Spokane Aquifer, the sole source of drinking water for 400,000 people in northern Idaho and northeast Washington. Preliminary tests showed no immediate threat to drinking water, but Washington state agencies formed a network to monitor the situation and push for more scrutiny of potential sources of contamination. The chemical components of diesel fuel found in a monitoring well violated certain Washington standards that Idaho does not have. The railroad may be required to dig up soil under the broken pipes to prevent further contamination. Burlington Northern and Santa Fe Co. apologized and vowed to take measures to ensure another spill won't happen.

See also 

 BNSF railway
 Burlington Northern railway
 Hauser, ID
 Rathdrum, ID

References 

BNSF Railway
Kootenai County, Idaho